Rene Lopez (born August 6, 1969) is a disco, funk, and electric latin soul musician and singer-songwriter.

Biography 
Rene Lopez II was born August 6, 1969 in the Bronx, the son of an Italian mother and Puerto Rican salsa musician, Rene Lopez Sr., who played trumpet during the heyday of Fania Records with the Ray Barretto Orchestra and Típica 73, bands beloved by New York's Latin community.

When a kid, Rene Lopez was heavily into Led Zeppelin and Prince. Especially Prince influenced his music style, to bring different types of music together.

Rene Lopez's earliest memories are of standing in the wings of so many stages, while watching his father—renowned salsa musician Rene Lopez Sr.—perform. Sr. played on all kinds of them – from small cramped club stages in the Bronx, to Radio City Music Hall, Carnegie Hall, and Madison Square Garden. Rene can still recall the club circuit's heady mix of cigarettes, sweat, and perfume enveloping his senses, and how the music connected the musicians to the audience, and he can still recall wanting to also be onstage.

Rene inherited a rich modern Latin music tradition from his father, but over the past 20 years he has built a legacy on his own terms, blurring lines between funk, hip-hop, rock, jazz, EDM, and pop while, along the way, working with a diverse roster of icons. Today, he embraces a new era of his creativity with his Jam Of The Month Club song series.

“I went back to the studio, locked the door, and got back to what I loved,” the New York-based singer, songwriter, producer, multi-instrumentalist recalls. “I still feel like a kid, new ideas keep pouring out and I feel like I have an open palette to work with.”

Throughout his career Rene has worked with Joseph Arthur as well as with members of Wilco, Blind Melon, The Meters, and Spin Doctors, and so many more. He's garnered acclaim from such publications as NPR, Vibe, Magnetic Mag, Joy Of Movement, Earmilk, Pop Shifter, Relix, Pancakes and Whiskey, Paste, Seen It Heard It, Mix Tape Maestro, The Aquarian, and The Washington Post, among countless others.

Rene's groundbreaking band in the 1990s, The Authority, blazed through the boundaries of hip-hop, Latin, and funk, playing gigs alongside P-Funk, The Meters, and Fishbone, earning accolades from jam band fanatics and hip-hop heads, who used to pack like sardines into The Wetlands Preserve and Nightingales to see them. Later, Rene started the band Wasabi with the legendary John Popper of Blues Traveler.

As a solo artist, he's released four albums and EPs that defy category, traversing intimate singer songwriter, traditional Latin, soul, funk, and pop rock. He began his career as a gifted drummer, and was part of the first wave students at the New School jazz program that also included John Popper, Eric Schenkman (Spin Doctors), along with modern jazz innovators Jesse Davis and Brad Mehldau. During this formative time, he studied with legendary drummer Bernard Purdie (The Beatles, James Brown, Aretha Franklin, The Rolling Stones) who gave Rene his first opportunity to step forward from behind the kit as a singer and songwriter.

At the most basic level, what struck Rene as a kid standing stage side at his father's shows was how those slinky salsa rhythms made people's body's move. That musician to audience relationship was about rhythm. Throughout his musical journey, first through exploring metal drumming, then funk, jazz, and a myriad of Latin styles, that rhythm connection would be central. Rene's artistry has matured into an aesthetic he's come to refer to as E.L.S. (Electric Latin Soul).

“New York is a melting pot of cultures and musical sensibilities—Brazilian music, Latin clave rhythms, 1980s electro-funk, and classic soul—and they all meld together in my head. I don’t label it, and I have no fear exploring these as an artist.”

Other disciples of groove compose vamps, but Rene has always been attentive to songcraft, putting that discipline on equal footing with his rhythms. While at the New School, Bernard Purdie conducted a songwriting contest. The winner would have his songs recorded at the famed New York studio The Record Plant. Rene submitted the first songs he ever wrote, and soon found himself making his debut with Bernard Purdie producing. That fateful turn of events changed his life as a musician, shifting his focus to composition and singing, and sending him on a profoundly winding and rewarding musical journey.

All roads led to the Jam of the Month Club. “It’s so gratifying the creativity is so wide open, and every month I get to put a smiles on faces with free music. This is what music should be about,” Rene shares. The first track debuted in September with “Heavy Baby Heavy” an invigorating homage to intelligent women bursting with sleek stanky funk that recalls the electro grooves of 1980s Prince and The Time. Rene has consistently offered a broad array of funky gems since. A recent highlight has been the deep swampy-soul of “Watch Me Turn It Up” recorded in New Orleans and featuring some of the Crescent City's finest, including George Porter Jr. from The Meters on bass and Ivan Neville on Hammond B-3 organ and piano. Watching those masters perform Rene's music was a career highlight. “It was so special, it made me feel like my funk was true.” Other spotlight jams are the psych-funk freak out “U Can Bet On Me,” featuring iconic bluesy vocalist Irving Louis Lattin, and a true 1980s feel.

Rene's father put down his horn many years ago in favor of a steadier living, and to this day Rene remains inspired by his father's legacy. “My father is so proud of me that I’ve stuck to it. He always says he’s blown away by my creativity. It means so much to me. I’m so excited to share my latest jams with him.”

NPR's Alt.Latino referred to Rene Lopez's music as one of Alt.Latino's favorites of 2014.

Discography

Singles & EPs 
 I Know What I See (2003)
 Johnny Wants to Be a Matador (2009)
 Midnight Love (2013)
 Let's Be Strangers Again (2013)
 Love Has No Mercy (2014)
 Borough Girl (2018)
 Brick Town Kids (2018)
 Once Again (2019)
 Nothings Left(2019)
 Runaway Heart (2019)
 Get It While You Can (2020)
 Hasta Luego (2021)
 Flamingo (2021)
 Life Ain't Anything Without Love (2021)
 Bet You Thought I'd Die (2021)

Albums 
 One Man's Year (2005)
 People Are Just People (2010)
 E.L.S. (2011)
 Paint The Moon Gold (2014)
 Holiday Heart (2016)

References

External links 
 Official website

1969 births
American male singer-songwriters
Musicians from New York City
Musicians from the Bronx
Living people
Singer-songwriters from New York (state)